McMorris is a surname. Notable people with the surname include:

Bill McMorris (born 1986), American journalist
Cathy McMorris Rodgers (born 1969), American politician
Charles McMorris (1890–1954), United States Navy admiral
Craig McMorris (born 1991), Canadian snowboarder
Don McMorris, Canadian politician
Easton McMorris (born 1935), Jamaican cricketer
Glenn McMorris, American kickboxer and karateka
Jerry McMorris (died 2012), American baseball executive
Kristina McMorris, American writer
Lois McMorris, American rock musician
Mark McMorris (born 1993), Canadian snowboarder